East Point is an inner northern suburb of the city of Darwin, Northern Territory of Australia.

East Point, Lee Point and Point Charles all appear on Goyder's original plan of Port Darwin in 1869. This point, the easterly extremity of the entrance to Darwin Harbour has been used for a variety of purposes. It was the site of naval and anti-aircraft guns during World War II (1942–46), a post war golf course and currently a recreation reserve including a pony club and a war museum.

In the  the suburb of East Point had a population of 14 people.

See also 
Darwin Military museum

References

External links 
  Place Names Committee – Place name origins

Suburbs of Darwin, Northern Territory